Unión Deportiva Socuéllamos is a Spanish football team based in Socuéllamos, Ciudad Real, in the autonomous community of Castilla-La Mancha. Founded in 1924, it plays in Segunda División RFEF – Group 5, holding home games at Estadio Paquito Jiménez, with a 2,500-seat capacity.

History
In 2014, UD Socuéllamos promoted for the first time in its history to Segunda División B, after beating in the promotion play-offs CD Praviano, CE Europa and Linares Deportivo.

Just two years later, the club qualified to the promotion play-offs to Segunda División but just the next season, the club was relegated to Tercera División after spending three years in the third tier.

Season to season

4 seasons in Segunda División B
1 season in Segunda División RFEF
28 seasons in Tercera División

Current squad

References

External links
Official website
Futbolme.com profile 
Club & stadium history 

Football clubs in Castilla–La Mancha
Association football clubs established in 1924
Divisiones Regionales de Fútbol clubs
1924 establishments in Spain
Province of Ciudad Real